Dominic Edmund Samuel (born September 29, 1994) is a Canadian professional soccer player who plays as a defender for Forge FC in the Canadian Premier League.

Early life
He began playing youth soccer with East York SC. Afterwards, he joined Sigma FC.

College career
In 2012, he began attending Southern New Hampshire University, where he played for the men's soccer team. He scored his first collegiate goal on September 26, 2012 against the Saint Michael's Purple Knights. After his freshman season, he was named to the Northeast-10 Second Team and All-Rookie Team, as well as being a Daktronics Second Team All-Region. After his sophomore season, he was a NSCAA Second Team All-America selection, NSCAA First Team All-Region and Daktronics Second Team All-Region, Northeast-10 First Team All-Conference, and was named to the Northeast-10 and NCAA All-Championship teams. In 2014, he was a Northeast-10 First Team All-Conference Team and Northeast-10 All-Championship Team selection and was named to Daktronics Division II Conference Commissioners Association All-America Second Team. As a senior he was an NSCAA First-Team All-American, CCA First-Team All-American, CCA All-East Region First Team, and Northeast-10 Defender of the Year.

Club career
In 2014, he played with the Seacoast United Phantoms in the Premier Development League.

In 2015, he played in League1 Ontario with Sigma FC. He was named the league Defender of the Year that season, as well as being named a league First-Team All-Star.

After college, Samuel trialed with Major League Soccer club New England Revolution, but ultimately did not sign with the club He instead joined the Rochester Rhinos in the American second-tier United Soccer League.

In 2017, he returned to Sigma FC, playing with them for two seasons. In 2018, he was named the league Defender of the Year for the second time, as well as a First-Team All-Star. Over his two seasons, he scored three goals in 33 regular season appearances. While with Sigma, Samuel worked 10 hour weekday shifts in a lumberyard, before heading to trainings, and five hour shifts on weekend gamedays. In 2020, he was named to the All-Time League1 Ontario Best XI.

In February 2019, Samuel signed with Canadian Premier League side Forge FC. In February 2021, the club picked up his club option for the 2021 season. He led the team in blocks and aerial duels won in 2021. In January 2022, he re-signed with the club on a new multi-year contract.

International career
In April 2011, Samuel attended his first Canadian national team camp with the under-17 team.

Career statistics

Honours

Club
Forge FC
Canadian Premier League: 2019, 2020

Individual
 League1 Ontario Defender of the Year: 2015, 2018
 League1 Ontario First-Team All-Star: 2015, 2018

References

External links
 

1994 births
Living people
Association football defenders
Canadian soccer players
Soccer players from Toronto
Black Canadian soccer players
Canadian expatriate soccer players
Expatriate soccer players in the United States
Canadian expatriate sportspeople in the United States
Southern New Hampshire Penmen men's soccer players
Seacoast United Phantoms players
Rochester New York FC players
Forge FC players
USL League Two players
League1 Ontario players
USL Championship players
Canadian Premier League players
Sigma FC players